Brahmaputra  may refer to:

 Brahmaputra River - A river of Asia.
 Old Brahmaputra River - A river in north-central Bangladesh.
 Dead Brahmaputra River